In continuum mechanics, viscous damping is a formulation of the damping phenomena, in which the source of damping force is modeled as a function of the volume, shape, and velocity of an object traversing through a real fluid with viscosity.

Typical examples of viscous damping in mechanical systems include:
 Fluid films between surfaces
 Fluid flow around a piston in a cylinder
 Fluid flow through an orifice
 Fluid flow within a journal bearing

Viscous damping also refers to damping devices. Most often they damp motion by providing a force or torque opposing motion proportional to the velocity. This may be affected by fluid flow or motion of magnetic structures. The intended effect is to improve the damping ratio.

 Shock absorbers in cars
 Seismic retrofitting with viscous dampers
 Tuned mass dampers in tall buildings
 Deployment actuators in spacecraft

See also
 Hysteresis
 Coulomb damping

References

Mechanical vibrations
Fluid mechanics 
Control theory